Linda Simiki Folaumoetu’i is a Tongan lawyer and civil servant. Since 2019 she has served as Attorney General of Tonga, and is the first woman to ever serve in that role.

Folaumoetu’i was educated at the University of Auckland, University of the South Pacific, and University of Melbourne. She worked as a legal officer for Tonga's Crown Law Department from 1993. In December 2006 she was appointed Solicitor General of Tonga. As Solicitor-General, she was responsible for the unsuccessful prosecution of pro-democracy members of Parliament over the 2006 Nukuʻalofa riots.

From 2008 to 2014 she worked as a litigation advisor to the Regional Assistance Mission to Solomon Islands. After returning to Tonga in 2015 she was appointed chief executive of the Office of the Commissioner for Public Relations. In 2016 she was appointed to Tonga's Electoral Commission. In June 2017 she was appointed to the Judicial Committee of the Privy Council of Tonga as a Law Lord.

In March 2019 she was appointed Attorney-General, the first woman to hold the position. As Attorney-General she considered laying treason charges against people criticising Tonga's royal family on Facebook, and met with Facebook over a proposal to ban the service from Tonga.

References

Living people
University of Auckland alumni
University of the South Pacific alumni
University of Melbourne alumni
Tongan lawyers
Tongan civil servants
Solicitors-General of Tonga
Attorneys General of Tonga
Judicial Committee of the Privy Council of Tonga members
Year of birth missing (living people)